Sam Nusum (born 3 October 1943) is a retired soccer player from Bermuda who played at both professional and international levels as a goalkeeper.

Career
Nusum appeared in the North American Soccer League for the Montreal Olympique, the Vancouver Whitecaps and the New York Cosmos, making a total of 67 appearances.

He also played at international level for Bermuda.

Personal life
Nusum is the brother of fellow player John Nusum, and the uncle of current profession John Barry Nusum.

References

1943 births
Living people
Bermudian footballers
Bermudian expatriate footballers
Bermuda international footballers
Montreal Olympique players
Vancouver Whitecaps (1974–1984) players
New York Cosmos players
North American Soccer League (1968–1984) players
North American Soccer League (1968–1984) indoor players
Expatriate soccer players in the United States
Bermudian expatriate sportspeople in the United States
Expatriate soccer players in Canada
Bermudian expatriate sportspeople in Canada
Association football goalkeepers